The members of the third National Assembly of South Korea were elected on 20 May 1954. The Assembly sat from 31 May 1954 until 30 May 1958.

Members

Seoul

Gyeonggi

North Chungcheong

South Chungcheong

North Jeolla

South Jeolla

North Gyeongsang

South Gyeongsang

Gangwon

Jeju

Notes

References

003
National Assembly members 003